Anson may refer to:

People
 Anson (name), a give name and surname
 Anson family, a British aristocratic family with the surname

Places

US
 Anson, Indiana
 Anson, Kansas
 Anson, Maine
 Anson (CDP), Maine
 Anson, Missouri
 Anson, Texas
 Anson, Wisconsin
 Anson (community), Wisconsin
 Anson County, North Carolina

Malaysia
 Teluk Anson, former name for the town Teluk Intan in Perak, Malaysia

Singapore
 Anson, Singapore

Other uses
 Anson Engine Museum, a museum based in Poynton, England
 HMS Anson, eight ships or submarines of the Royal Navy
 Avro Anson, a World War II aircraft of the Royal Air Force
 Anson Cars, a defunct racing car constructor

See also
Hanson (disambiguation)